Sir Philip Sidney (30 November 1554 – 17 October 1586) was an English poet, courtier, scholar and soldier who is remembered as one of the most prominent figures of the Elizabethan age. His works include a sonnet sequence, Astrophel and Stella, a treatise, The Defence of Poesy (also known as The Defence of Poesie or An Apology for Poetrie) and a pastoral romance, The Countess of Pembroke's Arcadia.

Early life
Born at Penshurst Place, Kent, of an aristocratic family, he was educated at Shrewsbury School and Christ Church, Oxford. He was the eldest son of Sir Henry Sidney and Lady Mary Dudley. His mother was the eldest daughter of John Dudley, 1st Duke of Northumberland, and the sister of Robert Dudley, 1st Earl of Leicester. His younger brother, Robert Sidney was a statesman and patron of the arts, and was created Earl of Leicester in 1618. His younger sister, Mary, married Henry Herbert, 2nd Earl of Pembroke and was a writer, translator and literary patron. Sidney dedicated his longest work, the Arcadia, to her. After her brother's death, Mary reworked the Arcadia, which became known as The Countess of Pembroke's Arcadia.

Politics and marriage
In 1572, at the age of 18, he was elected to Parliament as a Member of Parliament for Shrewsbury and in the same year travelled to France as part of the embassy to negotiate a marriage between Elizabeth I and the Duc D'Alençon. He spent the next several years in mainland Europe, moving through Germany, Italy, Poland, the Kingdom of Hungary and Austria. On these travels, he met a number of prominent European intellectuals and politicians.

Returning to England in 1575, Sidney met Penelope Devereux (who would later marry Robert Rich, 1st Earl of Warwick). Although much younger, she would inspire his famous sonnet sequence of the 1580s, Astrophel and Stella. Her father, Walter Devereux, 1st Earl of Essex, was said to have planned to marry his daughter to Sidney, but he died in 1576 and this did not occur. In England, Sidney occupied himself with politics and art. He defended his father's administration of Ireland in a lengthy document.

More seriously, he quarrelled with Edward de Vere, 17th Earl of Oxford, probably because of Sidney's opposition to the French marriage of Elizabeth to the much younger Alençon, which de Vere championed. In the aftermath of this episode, Sidney challenged de Vere to a duel, which Elizabeth forbade. He then wrote a lengthy letter to the Queen detailing the foolishness of the French marriage. Characteristically, Elizabeth bristled at his presumption, and Sidney prudently retired from court.

During a 1577 diplomatic visit to Prague, Sidney secretly visited the exiled Jesuit priest Edmund Campion.

Sidney had returned to court by the middle of 1581 and in 1584 was MP for Kent. That same year Penelope Devereux was married, apparently against her will, to Lord Rich. Sidney was knighted in 1583. An early arrangement to marry Anne Cecil, daughter of Sir William Cecil and eventual wife of de Vere, had fallen through in 1571. In 1583, he married Frances, the 16-year-old daughter of Sir Francis Walsingham. In the same year, he made a visit to Oxford University with Giordano Bruno, the polymath known for his cosmological theories, who subsequently dedicated two books to Sidney.

In 1585 the couple had one daughter, Elizabeth, who later married Roger Manners, 5th Earl of Rutland, in March 1599 and died without issue in 1612. <ref>N. E. McClure, ed. The Letters of Chamberlain, John Philadelphia, 1939, Vol II, p. 377</ref>Hutchinson, Robert (2007) Elizabeth's Spy Master: Francis Walsingham and the Secret War that Saved England. London: Weidenfeld & Nicolson. , pp. 266–267.

Literary writings
Like the best of the Elizabethans, Sidney was successful in more than one branch of literature, but none of his work was published during his lifetime. His finest achievement was a sequence of 108 love sonnets. These owe much to Petrarch and Pierre de Ronsard in tone and style, and place Sidney as the greatest Elizabethan sonneteer after Shakespeare. Written to his mistress, Lady Penelope Rich, though dedicated to his wife, they reveal true lyric emotion couched in a language delicately archaic. In form Sidney usually adopts the Petrarchan octave (ABBAABBA), with variations in the sestet that include the English final couplet. His artistic contacts were more peaceful and significant for his lasting fame. During his absence from court, he wrote Astrophel and Stella (1591) and the first draft of The Arcadia and The Defence of Poesy. His pastoral romance The Arcadia (1598) is an intricate love story, embodying the ideals of the medieval chivalry, so congenial to Sidney's own spirit. The story is diffused and involved, and the many secondary love stories interwoven with the main one distract attention. The characters are vague and idealized. The style, in its strength and its weaknesses, is that of a poet writing prose; melodious, picturesque, rather artificial and ornamental. The story contains a number of fine lyrics. Somewhat earlier, he had met Edmund Spenser, who dedicated The Shepheardes Calender to him. Other literary contacts included membership, along with his friends and fellow poets Fulke Greville, Edward Dyer, Edmund Spenser and Gabriel Harvey, of the (possibly fictitious) "Areopagus", a humanist endeavour to classicise English verse. 

Military activity
Sidney played a brilliant part in the military/literary/courtly life common to the young nobles of the time. Both his family heritage and his personal experience (he was in Walsingham's house in Paris during the Saint Bartholomew's Day Massacre), confirmed him as a keenly militant Protestant. 

In the 1570s, he persuaded John Casimir to consider proposals for a united Protestant effort against the Catholic Church and Spain. In the early 1580s, he argued fruitlessly for an assault on Spain itself. Promoted General of Horse in 1583, his enthusiasm for the Protestant struggle was given free rein when he was appointed governor of Flushing in the Netherlands in 1585. Whilst in the Netherlands, he consistently urged boldness on his superior, his uncle the Earl of Leicester. He carried out a successful raid on Spanish forces near Axel in July 1586.

Injury and death

Later that year, he joined Sir John Norris in the Battle of Zutphen, fighting for the Protestant cause against the Spanish. During the battle, he was shot in the thigh and died of gangrene 26 days later, at the age of 31. One account says this death was avoidable and heroic. Sidney noticed that one of his men was not fully armoured. He took off his thigh armour on the grounds that it would be wrong to be better armored than his men. As he lay dying, Sidney composed a song to be sung by his deathbed. According to the story, while lying wounded he gave his water to another wounded soldier, saying, "Thy necessity is yet greater than mine". This became possibly the most famous story about Sir Philip, intended to illustrate his noble and gallant character. It also inspired evolutionary biologist John Maynard Smith to formulate a problem in signalling theory which is known as the Sir Philip Sidney game.

Sidney's body was returned to London and interred in Old St Paul's Cathedral on 16 February 1587. The grave and monument were destroyed in the Great Fire of London in 1666. A modern monument in the crypt lists his among the important graves lost.

Already during his own lifetime, but even more after his death, he had become for many English people the very epitome of a Castiglione courtier: learned and politic, but at the same time generous, brave, and impulsive. The funeral procession was one of the most elaborate ever staged, so much so that his father-in-law, Francis Walsingham, almost went bankrupt. As Sidney was a brother of the Worshipful Company of Grocers, the procession included 120 of his company brethren.

Never more than a marginal figure in the politics of his time, he was memorialised as the flower of English manhood in Edmund Spenser's Astrophel, one of the greatest English Renaissance elegies.

An early biography of Sidney was written by his friend and schoolfellow, Fulke Greville. While Sidney was traditionally depicted as a staunch and unwavering Protestant, recent biographers such as Katherine Duncan-Jones have suggested that his religious loyalties were more ambiguous. He was known to be friendly and sympathetic towards individual Catholics.

WorksThe Lady of May – This is one of Sidney's lesser-known works, a masque written and performed for Queen Elizabeth in 1578 or 1579.Astrophel and Stella – The first of the famous English sonnet sequences, Astrophel and Stella was probably composed in the early 1580s. The sonnets were well-circulated in manuscript before the first (apparently pirated) edition was printed in 1591; only in 1598 did an authorised edition reach the press. The sequence was a watershed in English Renaissance poetry. In it, Sidney partially nativised the key features of his Italian model, Petrarch: variation of emotion from poem to poem, with the attendant sense of an ongoing, but partly obscure, narrative; the philosophical trappings; the musings on the act of poetic creation itself. His experiments with rhyme scheme were no less notable; they served to free the English sonnet from the strict rhyming requirements of the Italian form.The Countess of Pembroke's Arcadia – The Arcadia, by far Sidney's most ambitious work, was as significant in its own way as his sonnets. The work is a romance that combines pastoral elements with a mood derived from the Hellenistic model of Heliodorus. In the work, that is, a highly idealised version of the shepherd's life adjoins (not always naturally) with stories of jousts, political treachery, kidnappings, battles, and rapes. As published in the sixteenth century, the narrative follows the Greek model: stories are nested within each other, and different storylines are intertwined. The work enjoyed great popularity for more than a century after its publication. William Shakespeare borrowed from it for the Gloucester subplot of King Lear; parts of it were also dramatised by John Day and James Shirley. According to a widely told story, King Charles I quoted lines from the book as he mounted the scaffold to be executed; Samuel Richardson named the heroine of his first novel Pamela; or, Virtue Rewarded after Sidney's Pamela. Arcadia exists in two significantly different versions. Sidney wrote an early version (the Old Arcadia) during a stay at Mary Herbert's house; this version is narrated in a straightforward, sequential manner. Later, Sidney began to revise the work on a more ambitious plan, with much more backstory about the princes, and a much more complicated story-line, with many more characters. He completed most of the first three books, but the project was unfinished at the time of his death – the third book breaks off in the middle of a sword fight. There were several early editions of the book. Fulke Greville published the revised version alone, in 1590. The Countess of Pembroke, Sidney's sister, published a version in 1593, which pasted the last two books of the first version onto the first three books of the revision. In the 1621 version, Sir William Alexander provided a bridge to bring the two stories back into agreement. It was known in this cobbled-together fashion until the discovery, in the early twentieth century, of the earlier version.An Apology for Poetry (also known as A Defence of Poesie and The Defence of Poetry) – Sidney wrote Defence of Poetry before 1583. It has taken its place among the great critical essays in English. It is generally believed that he was at least partly motivated by Stephen Gosson, a former playwright who dedicated his attack on the English stage, The School of Abuse, to Sidney in 1579, but Sidney primarily addresses more general objections to poetry, such as those of Plato. In his essay, Sidney integrates a number of classical and Italian precepts on fiction. The essence of his defence is that poetry, by combining the liveliness of history with the ethical focus of philosophy, is more effective than either history or philosophy in rousing its readers to virtue. The work also offers important comments on Edmund Spenser and the Elizabethan stage.The Sidney Psalms – These English translations of the Psalms were completed in 1599 by Philip Sidney's sister Mary.

In popular culture
A memorial, erected in 1986 at the location in Zutphen where he was mortally wounded by the Spanish, can be found at the entrance of a footpath (" 't Gallee") located in front of the petrol station at the Warnsveldseweg 170.

In Arnhem, in front of the house in the Bakkerstraat 68, an inscription on the ground reads: "IN THIS HOUSE DIED ON THE 17 OCTOBER 1586 * SIR PHILIP SIDNEY * ENGLISH POET, DIPLOMAT AND SOLDIER, FROM HIS WOUNDS SUFFERED AT THE BATTLE OF ZUTPHEN. HE GAVE HIS LIFE FOR OUR FREEDOM". The inscription was unveiled on 17 October 2011, exactly 425 years after his death, in the presence of Philip Sidney, 2nd Viscount De L'Isle, a descendant of the brother of Philip Sidney.

The city of Sidney, Ohio, in the United States and a street in Zutphen, Netherlands, have been named after Sir Philip. A statue of him can be found in the park at the Coehoornsingel where, in the harsh winter of 1795, English and Hanoverian soldiers were buried who had died while retreating from advancing French troops.

Another statue of Sidney, by Arthur George Walker, forms the centrepiece of the Old Salopians Memorial at Shrewsbury School to alumni who died serving in World War I (unveiled 1924).

In the Monty Python's Flying Circus sketches "Tudor Jobs Agency", "Pornographic Bookshop" and "Elizabethan Pornography Smugglers" (Season 3, episode 10), Superintendent Gaskell, a vice squad policeman, is transported back to the Elizabethan age and assumes Sir Philip Sidney's identity.

An epitaph of Sir Philip Sidney: 
"England has his body, for she it fed;
Netherlands his blood, in her defence shed;
The Heavens have his soul,
The Arts have his fame,
The soldier his grief,
The world his good name."

References

Further reading
Works
The Poems of Sir Philip Sidney, ed. William A. Ringler. Oxford University Press, 1962. The Countess of Pembroke's Arcadia, ed. Maurice Evans. Penguin Books, 1997. The Sidney Psalms, completed by Mary Sidney Herbert, Countess of Pembroke, ed. R.E. Pritchard. Fyfield Books. 

Books
Alexander, Gavin. Writing After Sidney: the literary response to Sir Philip Sidney 1586–1640. Oxford: Oxford University Press, 2006.
Allen, M. J. B. et al. Sir Philip Sidney's Achievements. New York: AMS Press, 1990.
Craig, D. H. "A Hybrid Growth: Sidney's Theory of Poetry in An Apology for Poetry." Essential Articles for the Study of Sir Philip Sidney. Ed. Arthur F. Kinney. Hamden: Archon Books, 1986.
Davies, Norman. Europe: A History. London: Pimlico, 1997.
Duncan-Jones, Katherine. Sir Philip Sidney: Courtier Poet. New Haven and London: Yale University Press, 1991.
Frye, Northrup. Words With Power: Being a Second Study of the Bible and Literature. Toronto: Penguin Books, 1992.
Garrett, Martin. Ed. Sidney: the Critical Heritage. London: Routledge, 1996.
Greville, Fulke.Life of the Renowned Sir Philip Sidney. London, 1652.
Hale, John. The Civilization of Europe in the Renaissance. New York: Atheeum, 1994.
Howell, Roger. Sir Philip Sidney: The Shepherd Knight. London: Hutchinson, 1968.
Jasinski, James. Sourcebook on Rhetoric: Key Concepts in Contemporary Rhetorical Studies. Thousand Oaks: Sage Publications, 2001.
Kimbrough, Robert. Sir Philip Sidney. New York: Twayne Publishers, Inc., 1971.
Kuin, Roger (ed.), "The Correspondence of Sir Philip Sidney". 2 vols. Oxford: Oxford University Press, 2012.
Leitch, Vincent B., Ed. The Norton Anthology of Theory and Criticism. New York: W. W. Norton & Company, Inc., 2001.
Lewis, C. S. English Literature in the Sixteenth Century, Excluding Drama. Oxford: Oxford University Press, 1954.
Robertson, Jean. "Philip Sidney." In The Spenser Encyclopedia. eds. A. C. Hamilton et al. Toronto: University of Toronto Press, 1990.
Shelley, Percy Bysshe. "A Defence of Poetry." In Shelley’s Poetry and Prose: A Norton Critical Edition. 2nd ed. Eds. Donald H. Reiman and Neil Fraistat. New York: W. W. Norton & Company, 2002.
Sidney, Philip. A Defence of Poesie and Poems. London: Cassell and Company, 1891.
Van Dorsten, Jan, et al. Sir Philip Sidney: 1586 and the Creation of a Legend. Leiden: Brill, 1986.
 Woudhuysen, H. R., Sir Philip Sidney and the Circulation of Manuscripts, 1558-1640, Oxford: Clarendon Press, 1996The Cambridge History of English and American Literature. Volume 3. Cambridge: Cambridge University Press, 1910.

Articles
Acheson, Kathy. "'Outrage your face': Anti-Theatricality and Gender in Early Modern Closet Drama by Women." Early Modern Literary Studies 6.3 (January, 2001): 7.1–16. 21 October 2005.
Bear, R. S. "Defence of Poesie: Introduction. In Renascence Editions. 21 October 2005.
Griffiths, Matthew. English Court Poets and Petrarchism: Wyatt, Sidney and Spenser. 25 November 2005.
Harvey, Elizabeth D. Sidney, Sir Philip. In The Johns Hopkins Guide to Literary Theory & Criticism. 25 November 2005.
Knauss, Daniel, Philip. Love’s Refinement: Metaphysical Expressions of Desire in Philip Sidney and John Donne., Master's Thesis submitted to the Faculty of the North Carolina State University. 25 November 2005.
Maley, Willy. Cultural Materialism and New Historicism. 8 November 2005
Mitsi, Efterpi. The "Popular Philosopher": Plato, Poetry, and Food in Tudor Aesthetics. In Early Modern Literary Studies. 9 November 2004.
Pask, Kevin. "The "mannes state" of Philip Sidney: Pre-scripting the Life of the Poet in England." 25 November 2005.
Staff. Sir Philip Sidney 1554–1586, Poets' Graves. Accessed 26 May 2008

Other
Stump, Donald (ed). "Sir Philip Sidney: World Bibliography, Saint Louis University. Accessed 26 May 2008. "This site is the largest collection of bibliographic references on Sidney in existence. It includes all the items originally published in Sir Philip Sidney: An Annotated Bibliography of Texts and Criticism, 1554–1984'' (New York: G.K. Hall, Macmillan 1994) as well updates from 1985 to the present."

External links

 
 The Correspondence of Philip Sidney in EMLO
  
 
 Audio: Robert Pinsky reads "My True Love Hath My Heart and I Have His" by Philip Sidney (via poemsoutloud.net)
 
 
 

English knights
16th-century English poets
Philip
Sonneteers
1554 births
1586 deaths
English courtiers
16th-century English diplomats
16th-century English soldiers
16th-century English novelists
People of the Elizabethan era
People educated at Shrewsbury School
People from Penshurst
English military personnel killed in action
English people of the Anglo-Spanish War (1585–1604)
Alumni of Christ Church, Oxford
Ambassadors of England to the Netherlands
Deaths from gangrene
English MPs 1572–1583
English MPs 1584–1585
British male poets
English male novelists
Burials at St Paul's Cathedral
Court of Elizabeth I
Knights Bachelor